Czarna Wieś Kościelna  is a village in the administrative district of Gmina Czarna Białostocka, within Białystok County, Podlaskie Voivodeship, in north-eastern Poland.

The village has a population of 630.

References

Villages in Białystok County
Białystok Voivodeship (1919–1939)